Morris Foster (26 October 1936 – 3 February 2020) was an Irish cyclist. He competed in the individual road race at the 1968 Summer Olympics.

References

External links
 

1936 births
2020 deaths
Irish male cyclists
Olympic cyclists of Ireland
Cyclists at the 1968 Summer Olympics
People from Maghera